Ștefan cel Mare is a commune in Călărași County, Muntenia, Romania. It is composed of a single village, Ștefan cel Mare.

References

Stefan cel Mare
Localities in Muntenia